Tyler Speer (born December 21, 1990) is an American stock car racing and drag boat racing driver. He currently competes in the Lucas Oil Drag Boat Racing Series and the ARCA Menards Series.

Racing career
Speer started racing motocross when he was five years old, followed by go-karts at the age of 12. In 2009, when he was 15, he competed in the Allison Legacy Series, winning a race and finishing fourth in the championship standings.

In December 2009, Speer earned an ARCA Racing Series license after testing at Daytona International Speedway. A year later, he made his ARCA debut at Rockingham Speedway, driving the No. 10 Chevrolet for 1995 series champion Andy Hillenburg; after qualifying 40th, he finished 32nd. He continued to compete part-time in ARCA, recording a top-ten (seventh-place finish) at Illinois State Fairgrounds in 2012. In 2016, he ran the Illinois and DuQuoin State Fairgrounds Racetrack races, finishing seventh in both events.

Speer began racing drag boats in 2015, driving a Hedman Husler Hedders Pro Modified for Amphibious Motorsports in the Lucas Oil Drag Boat Racing Series. In his debut, Speer was the fastest qualifier, followed by winning his first race in the second and third rounds. He ended the 2015 season with a seventh-place finish in the points standings. His Pro Modified boat featured parts from an ARCA car, such as the steering column and dry sump system. His boat and firesuit are also adorned with ARCA logos. In 2016, Speer had a slow start to the season as he suffered first-round eliminations in the first two races, but was able to take the points lead with two races remaining. At the final event held at Wild Horse Motorsports Park, Speer overcame a poor qualifying session to win the 2016 Pro Modified Division championship, ending the year with a 198-point advantage over the runner-up. He moved up to the Top Fuel Division in 2017, while also competing in Pro Outlaw races.

Personal life
Speer's father, Tim, is also a drag boat racer in addition to being the owner of the ProBoat service center. His girlfriend, Joslynn Wilde, operates his social media account and website.

Motorsports career results

ARCA Menards Series
(key) (Bold – Pole position awarded by qualifying time. Italics – Pole position earned by points standings or practice time. * – Most laps led.)

References

External links
 
 

1990 births
Living people
People from Woodstock, Georgia
Sportspeople from the Atlanta metropolitan area
Racing drivers from Georgia (U.S. state)
ARCA Menards Series drivers